Group C of the 2013 CONCACAF Gold Cup was one of three groups competing of nations at 2013 CONCACAF Gold Cup. The group's first round of matches were played on July 9, with the final round played on July 16. All six group matches were played at venues in the United States, in Portland, Oregon, Sandy, Utah and East Hartford, Connecticut. The group consisted of host, and four time Gold Cup champions, United States, as well as Belize, Costa Rica and Cuba. Three members of the Belizean team told FIFA officials that they were offered a bribe to throw their match against the United States. They declined the offer and a subsequent offer to not report the bribery attempt.

Standings

All times given are (UTC−4).

Costa Rica vs Cuba

Belize vs United States

United States vs Cuba

Costa Rica vs Belize

Cuba vs Belize

United States vs Costa Rica

References

External links
 Official website 

C